Cássia Kis (born 6 January 1958) is a Brazilian actress. Formerly known as Cássia Kiss, she included her husband's family name in her stage name between 2010 and 2015 and changed the middle pseudonym from Kiss to Kis (Cássia Kis Magro). Currently, her stage name is Cássia Kis.

Biography 
Born in São Caetano do Sul, Brazil. She has Hungarian grandparents. Kis is a vegetarian and use to be a member of the spiritualist community, but in 2021 she became a traditionalist Catholic and opposes abortion in all cases.

Career in television

Telenovelas
2023 - Travessia
2015 - A Regra do Jogo as Djanira
2012 - Amor Eterno Amor as Melissa Borges Sobral
2011 - Morde & Assopra as Dulce Maria
2010 - Escrito nas Estrelas as Francisca
2009 - Paraíso as Mariana
2007 - Eterna Magia as Zilda
2006 - Cobras & Lagartos as Henriqueta / Teresa
2002 - Sabor da Paixão as Cecília
2001 - Porto dos Milagres as Adma Guerrero
2000 - Esplendor as Adelaide
1998 - Pecado Capital as Eunice
1997 - Por Amor as Isabel
1996 - Quem É Você? as Beatriz
1993 - Fera Ferida as Ilka Tibiriçá
1990 - Barriga de Aluguel as Ana
1990 - Pantanal as Maria Marruá (Rede Manchete)
1988 - Vale Tudo as Leila
1987 - Brega & Chique as Silvana
1985 - Roque Santeiro as Lulu
1984 - Livre para Voar as Verona

TV series / Miniseries
2006 - JK as Maria
2005 - Mad Maria as Amália
2004 - Um Só Coração as Guiomar Penteado
2015 - Felizes para Sempre? as Olga
2016 - Nada Será Como Antes as Odete de Souza
2020 - Unsoul (Desalma) as Haia

Career in the movies 
 2009 - A Festa da Menina Morta
 2008 - Meu Nome Não É Johnny
 2007 - Chega de Saudade
 2007 - Não por Acaso
 2001 - Bicho de Sete Cabeças
 2001 - Condenado à Liberdade
 2000 - O Circo das Qualidades Humanas
 2000 - A Hora Marcada
 1991 - A Grande Arte
 1987 - Alta Rotação
 1987 - Ele, o Boto
 1987 - O País dos Tenentes
 1984 - Memórias do Cárcere

Main prizes 
 She won the Troféu Passista (Dancer Trophy) of best supporting actor, in the Festival of Recife, for Bicho de sete cabeças (2001).

Campaigns 
 In 1989, she appeared in an advertisement for the Ministry of Health about the prevention of the breast cancer.
 In 2006, she was a godmother, in Brazil, of the Worldwide Week of Maternal Breast-Feeding.

See also 

 Cimbres Marian apparition, promoted by the actress.

External links 

Cássia Kiss at Cine Players

References 

1958 births
Living people
People from São Caetano do Sul
Brazilian people of Hungarian descent
Brazilian film actresses
Brazilian telenovela actresses
Brazilian traditionalist Catholics
Converts to Roman Catholicism from spiritism or spiritualism
Brazilian anti-abortion activists